Rampur State was a 15 gun-salute princely state of British India. It came into existence on 7 October 1774 as a result of a treaty with Oudh. Following independence in 1947, Rampur State and other princely states of the area, such as Benares and Tehri Garhwal were merged into the United Provinces. Rampur state had its capital in Rampur city and its total area was 945 sq miles. Rampur state was founded by Ali Mohammad Khan's younger son Faiz-ullah Khan.
 
The Jama Masjid is one of the finest piece of architecture to be found in Rampur. It resembles the jama masjid in Delhi to some extent.[original research?] It was built by Nawab Faizullah Khan. It has a unique mughal touch to it. There are several entry-exit gates to the masjid. It has three big domes and four tall minarets with gold pinnacles boasting of a royal touch. It has a main lofty entrance gate that has an inbuilt clock tower occupied by a big clock that was imported from Britain.

There are several entry-exit gates built by the Nawab. These gates are major entry-exit routes from the city. Examples are Shahbad Gate, Nawab Gate, Bilaspur Gate etc.

Origin
The Rohilla State of Rampur was established by Nawab Faizullah Khan on 7 October 1774 in the presence of British Commander Colonel Champion, and remained a pliant state under British protection thereafter. Faizullah Khan was a leader among the Rohillas and a member of the Rohilla dynasty. He was the son of Ali Mohammed Khan, who was a Jat boy of age eight when he was adopted by the chief of the Pashtun Barech tribe, Sardar Daud Khan Rohilla. For Rohillas, Rampur State was one of the important princely states in Hindustan.

In the 19th century, the Nawabs of Rampur claimed that Ali Mohammed Khan was a Barha Sayyid and started using the title of Sayyid. However, they could not present any pedigree in the support of this claim.

History
The Rohilla War of 1774–75 began when the Rohillas reneged on a debt they owed to the Nawab of Oudh for military assistance against the Maratha Empire in 1772. The Rohillas were defeated and driven from their former capital of Bareilly by the Nawab of Oudh with the assistance of the East India Company's troops lent by Warren Hastings. 

The first stone of the new Fort at Rampur was laid and the city of Rampur founded in 1775 by Nawab Faizullah Khan. Originally it was a group of four villages named Kather, the name of Raja Ram Singh. The first Nawab proposed to rename the city 'Faizabad'. But many other places were known by the name Faizabad so its name was changed to Mustafabad alias Rampur. Nawab Faizullah Khan ruled for 20 years. He was a great patron of scholarship, and began the collection of Arabic, Persian, Turkish and Urdu manuscripts which now make up the bulk of the Rampur Raza Library. After his death, his son Muhammad Ali Khan took over. He was killed by the Rohilla leaders after 24 days, and Ghulam Muhammad Khan – the brother of the deceased, was proclaimed Nawab. The East India Company took exception to this, and after a reign of just 3 months and 22 days Ghulam Muhammad Khan was defeated by its forces, and the Governor-General made Ahmad Ali Khan, son of the late Muhammad Ali Khan, the new Nawab. He ruled for 44 years. He did not have any sons, so Muhammad Sa'id Khan, son of Ghulam Muhammad Khan, took over as the new Nawab. He raised a regular Army, established Courts and carried out many works to improve the economic conditions of farmers. His son Muhammad Yusuf Ali Khan took over after his death. His son Kalb Ali Khan became the new Nawab after his death in 1865.

Nawab Kalb Ali Khan was literate in Arabic and Persian. Under his rule the state did much work to uplift standards of education. He was also a Member of Council during the Viceroyalty of Lord John Lawrence. He built the Jama Masjid in Rampur at a cost of Rs. 300,000. He was also knighted in Agra by the Prince of Wales. He ruled for 22 years and 7 months. After his death his son Mushtaq Ali Khan took over. He appointed W. C. Wright as the Chief Engineer of the estate. He built many new buildings and canals. Nawab Hamid Ali became the new ruler in 1889 at the age of 14. Many new schools were opened during his reign, and many donations were provided to nearby colleges. He donated Rs. 50,000 to Lucknow Medical College. In 1905 he built the magnificent Darbar Hall within the Fort which now houses the great collection of Oriental manuscripts held by the Rampur Raza Library. His son Raza Ali Khan became the last ruling Nawab in 1930. Nawab Raza Ali Khan was a very progressive ruler who believed in the Inclusion of Hindus and so appointed Lt. Col. Horilal Varma – Bar At Law as his Prime Minister. On 1 July 1949 the State of Rampur was merged into the Republic of India. Rampur today presents a slightly decayed appearance: the palaces of the Nawabs are crumbling, as are the gates and walls of the fort. However, the Library remains a flourishing institution of immense value to scholars from all over the world.

The Nawabs of Rampur sided with the British during Indian Rebellion of 1857 and this enabled them to continue to play a role in the social, political and cultural life of Northern India in general and the Muslims of United Provinces in particular. They gave refuge to some of the literary figures from the Court of Bahadur Shah Zafar.

Music

The Rampur-Sahaswan gharana of Hindustani classical music also has its origins in court musicians. Ustad Mehboob Khan, was a khayal singer and Veena player of the Rampur court; his son Ustad Inayat Hussain Khan (1849–1919), who trained and lived in the city, founded the gharana.

The Nawabs of Rampur gave patronage to traditional music in their court. Mehboob Khan was the chief khyal singer of the royal court of Rampur State, his tradition was followed by his son Inayat Hussain Khan (1849–1919) and in turn by Inyat's brothers-in-law, Haider Khan (1857–1927), and Mushtaq Hussein Khan (d. 1964), which gave rise to the Rampur-Sahaswan gharana of Hindustani classical music, the latter being their ancestral place, Sahaswan, in present-day Badaun district.

Rulers of Rampur

Family tree

 I. Sayyid Faizu’llah ‘Ali Khan Bahadur, Nawab of Rampur (1734–1794; Nawab of Rampur: 1734–1794)
 II. Sayyid Muhammad Ali Khan Bahadur, Nawab of Rampur (1751–1794; r. 1794)
  IV. Sayyid Ahmad Ali Khan Bahadur, Nawab of Rampur (1787–1840; r. 1794–1840)
  III. Hajji Sayyid Ghulam Muhammad Khan Bahadur, Nawab of Rampur (1763–1823; r. 1794)
  V. Sayyid Muhammad Said Khan Bahadur, Nawab of Rampur (1786–1855; r. 1840–1855)
  VI. Sayyid Muhammad Yusef Ali Khan Bahadur, Nawab of Rampur KSI (1816–1865; r. 1855–1865)
  VII. Hajji Sayyid Muhammad Kalb-i-Ali Khan Bahadur, Nawab of Rampur GCSI, CIE (1834–1887; r. 1865–1887)
  VIII. Sayyid Muhammad Mushtaq Ali Khan Bahadur, Nawab of Rampur (1856–1889; r. 1887–1889)
  IX. Sayyid Hamid Ali Khan Bahadur, Nawab of Rampur GCSI, GCIE, GCVO (1875–1930; r. 1889–1930) 
  X. Sayyid Muhammad Raza Ali Khan Bahadur, Nawab of Rampur GCIE, KCSI (1908–1966; r. 1930–1949; titular ruler 1949–1966) 
XI. Sayyid Murtaza Ali Khan Bahadur MBE (lived 1923–1982; titular Nawab: 1966–1971; family head: 1971–1982)
XII. Sayyid Zulfiqar Ali Khan Bahadur, Nawab of Rampur (lived 1933–92; family head:1982-92)
 XIII. Sayyid Kazim Ali Khan Bahadur, Nawab of Rampur (b.1960; family head:1992 to present)

Legacy

Dog breed

His Royal Highness Nawab Ahmad Ali Khan of Rampur is credited with developing the dog breed known as Rampur Hound. The Rampur Hound far exceeded his expectations. He endeavoured to breed these dogs by combining the Tazi ferocious Afghan dogs with the English Greyhound, more obedient but less resistant to the harsher local weather. He gave the name 'Rampur Hound' to the dogs he bred.

Cuisine
The cuisine of the royal courts over the years gave rise to the Rampuri cuisine, developed by the chefs of the Nawabs. After the Indian Mutiny of 1857, the khansamas (chefs) from erstwhile Mughal imperial courts shifted to Rampur, bringing along with them the Mughal cuisine tradition. Gradually people from other places also found a haven here, adding influences of Awadhi, Hyderabad and Kashmiri cuisine. It is also known for its distinct flavours and dishes with recipes passed on from the royal kitchen, like Rampuri fish, Rampuri Korma, Rampuri mutton kebabs, Doodhiya Biryani and adrak ka halwa.

Music
Mehboob Khan was the chief khyal singer of the royal court of Rampur State, his tradition was followed by his son Inayat Hussain Khan (1849–1919) and in turn by Inyat's brothers-in-law, Haider Khan (1857–1927), and Mushtaq Hussein Khan (d. 1964), which gave rise to the Rampur-Sahaswan gharana of Hindustani classical music, the latter being their ancestral place, Sahaswan, in present Badaun district.

See also
Mughal Empire
Maratha Empire
Rajputana
Central India Agency
Mahseer in heraldry
Political integration of India
Rampur Greyhound – History

References

Bibliography

External links

Muslim princely states of India
Princely states of Uttar Pradesh
Rampur district
1774 establishments in India
1947 disestablishments in India
States and territories established in 1774
States and territories disestablished in 1947
Pashtun dynasties
ru:Рампур